Erskine Road (Chinese: 厄士金路) is a one-way road located in Chinatown within the Outram Planning Area in Singapore.

Erskine Road starts at its junction with South Bridge Road and ends with its junction with Ann Siang Road and Kadayanallur Street.

Etymology and history
There were two possible reasons how the name of the road came about. Firstly, it was named after Samuel Erskine of Howarth Erskine and Company, an engineering company in the 1870s. Secondly, it was named after J.J. Erskine, a government officer who was recorded owning land in Singapore in 1824. As the road was only named in 1907 when houses are built along the road, it was most likely named after Samuel Erskine than J.J. Erskine.

See also
The Scarlet Hotel

References

Roads in Singapore
Chinatown, Singapore
Outram, Singapore